Another, entirely separate Park National Bank is a Chicago-based bank owned by FBOP Corporation, with branches in Chicago and several nearby suburbs. The Chicago bank failed on October 30, 2009, and was taken over by the Federal Deposit Insurance Corporation, with the bank's assets later being sold to US Bank.

Notes

Companies listed on NYSE American
Banks based in Illinois